Naomie Kabakaba Nsiala (born 4 February 1998), known as Naomie Kabakaba, is a DR Congolese footballer who plays as a defender for Galatasaray and the DR Congo women's national team.

Club career 
Kabakaba has played for FCF Bafana Bafana and OCL City in the Democratic Republic of the Congo.

Galatasaray 
On 4 February 2023, she transferred to the Turkish Women's Football Super League team  Galatasaray.

International career 
Kabakaba capped for the DR Congo at senior level during the 2020 CAF Women's Olympic Qualifying Tournament (third round).

International goals 
Scores and results list DR Congo's goal tally first

See also 
 List of Democratic Republic of the Congo women's international footballers

References

External links 

1998 births
Living people
Democratic Republic of the Congo women's footballers
Women's association football defenders
TP Mazembe players
Democratic Republic of the Congo women's international footballers
Expatriate women's footballers in Turkey
Democratic Republic of the Congo expatriate sportspeople in Turkey
Turkish Women's Football Super League players
Galatasaray S.K. women's football players